The 2017 Supercoppa Italiana was the 30th edition of the Supercoppa Italiana, the Italian football super cup. It was played on 13 August 2017 in Rome, Italy. With Juventus winning both the 2016–17 Serie A championship and the 2016–17 Coppa Italia, the game was played between Juventus and the 2016–17 Coppa Italia runners-up, Lazio. Lazio won the match 3–2 and claimed their fourth Supercoppa title.

Match

Details

See also

 2017–18 Serie A
 2017–18 Coppa Italia

References 

2017
Juventus F.C. matches
S.S. Lazio matches
2017–18 in Italian football cups
Sports competitions in Rome
August 2017 sports events in Europe